Julio Eduardo Mázzaro (born  30 January 1979 in Villa Regina, Río Negro) is a former Argentine professional basketball player. He also holds an Italian passport. At a height of 1.90 m (6' 2") tall, he played at the shooting guard position.

Professional career
Mázzaro played with River Plate and Boca Juniors in Argentina, and Edimes Pavia ('03–'04) in the Italian 2nd Division. He also played with Quimsa in Argentina. He was named the MVP of the second FIBA South American League tournament in 2009.

National team career
Mázzaro represented the Argentine national basketball team on a number of occasions, including the FIBA AmeriCup of 2005, the Stanković Cup, and the FIBA South American Championships in 2003 and 2004.

References
Latinbasket.com Profile
Basquete Profile 

1979 births
Living people
People from Villa Regina
Argentine men's basketball players
Basketball players at the 2003 Pan American Games
Boca Juniors basketball players
Ciclista Juninense basketball players
Italian men's basketball players
Quimsa basketball players
Club Atlético River Plate basketball players
Shooting guards
Pan American Games competitors for Argentina